Louis Chauchon was a 20th-century French architect who had a strong influence in French Indochina  creating major landmarks, some which have survived him, such as the Central Market in Phnom Penh, others, like the Cathedral of Phnom Penh, which, did not survive the violence of the Indochinese Wars.

Biography

The son of a provincial architect 
Adolphe Louis Léon Chauchon was born in Rive-de-Gier in the French department of the Loire on November 24, 1878. He was the son of Jean Pierre Édouard Chauchon, a 25 year—old architect, and Marie Léonie Gory, 22 years old.

Studying architecture with the masters of his time in Paris 
Chauchon  went to Paris to study architecture at the Beaux-Arts and was accepted in the atelier of French architect Émile Bénard in the 17th arrondissement of Paris on October 7, 1897. On November 3, 1903, he was admitted as a student of Gaston Redon, and with a scholarship offered by the City of Lyon, he obtained his first class degree on July 30, 1906. Chauchon graduated as a full-fledged architect on February 24, 1920, as part of the 112th promotion with a special project on a group of three residences for employees in Buenos-Aires.

Chauchon started working as a young architect in the 15th arrondissement of Paris in 1921 but he quickly applied for a job in Indochina with Public Works Department for Civil Buildings on June 14, 1921, and started. He started working as an architect in Cambodia in 1922. The first building he worked on was the National Library of Cambodia which was inaugurated  by the French colonial administration on 24 December 1924. He married Madeline Bayol, a French teacher in a primary school in Phnom Penh and they returned to France on a honeymoon six-month holiday from April 1925.

In Saigon in 1935, Chauchon was very avant-garde modernist when he designed a legal office at 161 Nguyen Du Street on the corner with Cach Mang Thang Tam Street in District 1. The building was later used at the Canadian embassy until 1975 and it was until recently used by the Vietnamese government of the immigration bureau. Louis Chauchon later designed the Clinique Saint-Paul which was opened as a Catholic hospital in December 1938. This new hospital continued work of the first private clinic of Saignon which had been founded by Doctor Marie Angier de Loheac and the Sisters of Saint Paul of Chartres and which is now the Ho Chi Minh City Eye Hospital currently located at 280 Dien Bien Phu Street in District 3.

After Jean Desbois who made the original design left the project, he completed his design in the construction of the Central market on Phnom Penh in 1937. His prowess obtained him a job a Chief Architect of Civil Buildings in Saigon. He returned to live there and continued to build private houses for wealthy owners. In 1937, Chauchon was also chosen to be the architect of the new Cathedral of Phnom Penh according to the desire of Apostolic Vicar Jean Chabalier with the support of Pope Pius XI.

Death at the beginning of the First Indochinese War 
Chauchon died accidentally during in 1945 during aerial bombings of Saigon in the context of the First Indochina War. Maurice Masson replaced him as architect of the future Cathedral of Phnom Penh.

Legacy: bringing architectural modernism to French Indochina 
Chauchon left an important architectural legacy in Indochina. Though still tributary to the beaux-arts architecture, he left landmarks of art deco in South Vietnam which buildings such as his hospital in Saigon, a "formidable art deco building with its horizontal lines emphasized and the wings of buildings ending at the street with giant curved forms". Along with Masson, Chauchon contributed to transforming the architectural style of residential housing in Indochina and his realizations show that the locale bourgeoisie adhered to a new aesthetic. In Cambodia, the Phsar Thmey Central Market is "the principal building" designed by French architects in Phnom Penh. Chauchon was the first to important the new modernist architectural style to Cambodia at a time when there were no Khmer architectes. His architectural options had an impact on the urbanization of Phnom Penh and heavily influenced the first Khmer architect Vann Molyvann, who would integrate it in the New Khmer Architecture.

Awards and recognitions 
Chauchon was a member of the French Architects Association (Société des architectes diplômés par le gouvernement) from 1926 to 1945. In 1942, Chauchon won an architectural prize awarded by the Saigon University.

References 

French architects
Phnom Penh
1945 deaths
1878 births
Deaths by airstrike